During the 1994–95 English football season, Brentford competed in the Football League Second Division. After a runners-up finish in the league, club's season ended with defeat in the 1995 play-off semi-finals.

Season summary
Brentford entered the 1994–95 Second Division season with the nucleus of a new squad, built since the breakup of the team which was relegated from the First Division at the end of the 1992–93 season. Forward Nicky Forster was manager David Webb's only significant summer signing, a £200,000 buy from Third Division Gillingham.

Eight wins and four defeats from the opening 12 games saw the Bees placed 4th in the league, before four defeats in the next five matches dropped the club into mid-table. By early December 1994, first and second round exits from the three cup competitions lightened the fixture load and Brentford set off on a 14-match unbeaten run, winning 10 matches and racking up notable 7–0 and 6–0 victories over Plymouth Argyle and Cambridge United respectively. The victory over Cambridge United in late January 1995 returned the Bees to the top of the table for the first time since the opening day of the season, when five goals were put past Plymouth Argyle at Home Park. Twin strikers Nicky Forster and Robert Taylor were in imperious form, scoring over half the team's goals and forming a partnership that came to be known as the 'FT Index'. The pair saw to it that Brentford finished the 1994–95 season as the only club in the top four divisions with two players scoring 20 league goals or more.

The unbeaten run came to an end with defeat to Shrewsbury Town on 25 February, but another 11-match unbeaten sequence kept Brentford in top spot going into late April. Brentford's good form ran in tandem with that of Birmingham City's and the Blues topped the table for the first time in eight weeks on 19 April, with the Bees returning to the summit three days later after a 2–0 victory over Cardiff City. Due to a restructuring of the English league system, only top spot in the 1994–95 Second Division offered automatic promotion, which placed heavy emphasis on a "winner takes all" fixture between Birmingham City and Brentford on at St Andrew's on 26 April. A 2–0 defeat for Brentford in front of a 25,581 crowd (the Second Division's record attendance for the season), plus a home defeat to Bournemouth and a draw away with Bristol Rovers in the final two matches, led to a runners-up finish and a place in the play-offs. The Bees met fifth-placed Huddersfield Town in the play-off semi-finals and were knocked out on penalties at Griffin Park after a 2–2 draw on aggregate, with captain Jamie Bates seeing his decisive spot kick saved.

A number of club records were set or equalled during the season:

 Fewest Football League goals conceded in a season: 39 (equalled club record)
 Most clean sheets kept in a Football League season: 22 (equalled club record)
 Most goalscorers in a Football League match: 6 – Darren Annon, Paul Smith, Robert Taylor, Nicky Forster, Denny Mundee and Lee Harvey (versus Plymouth Argyle, 17 December 1994)

League table

Results
Brentford's goal tally listed first.

Legend

Pre-season and friendlies

Football League Second Division

Football League Second Division play-offs

FA Cup

League Cup

Football League Trophy

 Source: Statto, The Big Brentford Book Of The Nineties

Playing squad 
Players' ages are as of the opening day of the 1994–95 season.

 Source:The Big Brentford Book Of The Nineties

Coaching staff

Statistics

Appearances and goals
Substitute appearances in brackets.

Players listed in italics left the club mid-season.
Source: The Big Brentford Book Of The Nineties

Goalscorers 

Players listed in italics left the club mid-season.
Source: The Big Brentford Book Of The Nineties

Management

Summary

Transfers & loans

Kit

In February 1995, it was announced that Brentford had cancelled its sponsorship deal with KLM. As a result, the Hummel International home shirt was replaced by an unbranded replica, which was devoid of sponsorship.

 Home kit 1 only until March 1995
|
|
|
|
|

Awards 
 Supporters' Player of the Year: Jamie Bates
 Football League Second Division PFA Team of the Year: Nicky Forster
 Football League Second Division Manager of the Year: David Webb

References

Brentford F.C. seasons
Brentford